Bryan Wade (born 25 June 1963)  is an ex-English professional footballer who played as a centre forward for Swindon Town, Swansea City and Brighton & Hove Albion.

During the 1988-89 English football season  Wade received a three match ban for violent conduct as a result of elbowing Sheffield United's Chris Wilder in the face.

Honours
Swindon Town
Division Four: 1985–86

Swansea City
Welsh Cup: 1988–89

References

1965 births
Living people
Sportspeople from Bath, Somerset
English footballers
Association football forwards
Bath City F.C. players
Swindon Town F.C. players
Swansea City A.F.C. players
Brighton & Hove Albion F.C. players
Southern Football League players
National League (English football) players
English Football League players
Haverfordwest County A.F.C. players